Three Times Three is a studio album by jazz drummer Antonio Sánchez. The record was released on September 23, 2014 via CAM Jazz label.

Music and recording
The album was recorded in New York between October and December 2013. It teams Sánchez in three trio settings. One is with pianist Brad Mehldau and bassist Matt Brewer; another is with guitarist John Scofield and bassist Christian McBride; and the third is with tenor saxophonist Joe Lovano and bassist John Patitucci.

Reception
The album was released as a two-CD set on September 23, 2014, by CAM Jazz. The Financial Times' reviewer wrote that "Sanchez, in cracking form, brings out the best of his all-star cast with crisp rolls, light-touch cymbals and crashing interjections. Great tunes, strong moods and lots going on."

Track listing
"Nar-this"
"Constellations"
"Big Dream"
"Fall"
"Nook and Crannies"
"Rooney and Vinski"
"Leviathan"
"Firenze"
"I Mean You"

Personnel
 Antonio Sánchez – drums
 Matt Brewer – bass
 Joe Lovano – tenor saxophone
 Christian McBride – bass
 Brad Mehldau – piano
 John Patitucci – bass
 John Scofield – guitar

References

2014 albums
Antonio Sánchez (drummer) albums
CAM Jazz albums